Lamp At Midnight is a play that was written by Barrie Stavis, and first produced in 1947 at New Stages, New York. The play treats the 17th Century Galileo affair, which was a profound conflict between the Roman Catholic Church and Galileo Galilei over the interpretation of his astronomical observations using the newly invented telescope. By coincidence, Bertolt Brecht's play on the same theme, Life of Galileo, opened in New York just a few weeks before Lamp at Midnight. Some critics now consider Galileo to be a masterpiece, but in 1947 the New York Times reviewer, Brooks Atkinson, preferred Lamp at Midnight.

A revival of Lamp at Midnight directed by Sir Tyrone Guthrie and starring Morris Carnovsky toured the United States in 1969.

Adaptation for television

A television adaptation, directed by George Schaefer and starring Melvyn Douglas as Galileo, appeared in the Hallmark Hall of Fame series in 1966. A recording of the television performance was released to video in 1983.

References

Further reading
  Doctoral thesis that compares Lamp at Midnight with Bertolt Brecht's play, Galileo.
  Discussion of the reception of Stavis' play in 1947 and the production of the television adaptation in 1966. Both Melvyn Douglas and Kim Hunter, stars of the 1966 television production, had few opportunities for film and television work through the 1950s as a consequence of the Hollywood blacklist.

External links
 

Cultural depictions of Galileo Galilei
1947 plays
American plays
Plays set in Italy
Plays based on real people
Plays set in the 17th century
Plays adapted into television shows